The 1996–97 Algerian Cup was the 32nd edition of the Algerian Cup. USM Alger won the Cup by defeating CA Batna 1-0. It was USM Alger third Algerian Cup in its history.

Round of 64

Round of 32

Round of 16

Quarter-finals

Semi-finals

Final

Champions

External links
 1996/97 Coupe Nationale

References

Algerian Cup
Algerian Cup
Algerian Cup